Basic helix-loop-helix leucine zipper transcription factors are, as their name indicates, transcription factors containing both Basic helix-loop-helix and leucine zipper motifs.

Examples include Microphthalmia-associated transcription factor and Sterol regulatory element binding protein (SREBP).

External links
 

Gene expression
Transcription factors